Hugh Harris (born June 7, 1948) is a Canadian former professional ice hockey player. He played in the National Hockey League with the Buffalo Sabres during the 1972–73 season and in the World Hockey Association with the New England Whalers, Phoenix Roadrunners, Vancouver Blazers, Calgary Cowboys, Indianapolis Racers, and Cincinnati Stingers between 1973 and 1978.

In his NHL career, Harris appeared in 60 games. He scored 12 goals and added 26 assists. In the WHA, Harris played in 336 games, scoring 107 goals and 174 assists.

Harris was born in Toronto, Ontario.

Career statistics

Regular season and playoffs

External links
 

1948 births
Living people
Buffalo Sabres players
Calgary Cowboys players
Canadian expatriate ice hockey players in the United States
Canadian ice hockey centres
Cincinnati Stingers players
Cincinnati Swords players
Ice hockey people from Toronto
Indianapolis Racers players
Montreal Voyageurs players
Muskegon Mohawks players
New England Whalers players
Peterborough Petes (ice hockey) players
Phoenix Roadrunners (WHA) players
Vancouver Blazers players